Anthene ligures, the lesser indigo ciliate blue, is a butterfly in the family Lycaenidae. It is found in Ghana, Togo, Nigeria (south and the Cross River loop), Cameroon, Gabon, the Republic of the Congo, Angola, the Democratic Republic of the Congo, Uganda, western and central Kenya, Tanzania, Malawi and Zambia. The habitat consists of forests.

Adult males are attracted to damp patches.

The larvae feed on Celtis species. The larvae are green with a darker green dorsal line, flanked on either side with yellow.

References

Butterflies described in 1874
Anthene
Butterflies of Africa
Taxa named by William Chapman Hewitson